Warren Samuel Capone (born August 14, 1951) is a former American Football linebacker in the National Football League (NFL) for the Dallas Cowboys and New Orleans Saints. He also was a member of the Birmingham Americans and the Birmingham Vulcans in the World Football League. He played college football at Louisiana State University and is a member of the LSU Sports Hall of Fame.

Early years
Capone attended Catholic High School from 1966 to 1970. He was the heavyweight wrestling champion in the 1970 Baton Rouge City Championships.

College career
Capone accepted a football scholarship from Louisiana State University where he became a three-year starter and led the team in his last 2 seasons. He is one of only eight players in LSU football history to be named to the College Football All-America Team twice. He was also a two-time All-SEC selection in 1972 and 1973. He played in the Sun, Bluebonnet and Orange Bowls.

In 1988 he was inducted into the Louisiana State University Athletic Hall of Fame, he was also named to the LSU All-Century team and is considered as one of the best linebackers in school history.

Professional career

Birmingham Americans (WFL)
Although he was a great college player, he wasn't selected in the 1974 NFL Draft because he was considered small to play professional football. Instead of signing a rookie free agent contract for a team in the National Football League, he opted to sign with the Birmingham Americans of the World Football League.

As a rookie in 1974, Capone became the Americans starting middle linebacker, where he was known for his hard-hitting. The team finished the regular season with a record of 15-5 and became the inaugural World Football League champions.

In 1975, the Americans were replaced as the Birmingham WFL franchise by a new team called the Birmingham Vulcans. He was the leader of the defense, until the WFL folded in mid-season.

Dallas Cowboys
On November 22, 1975, he was signed as a free agent by the Dallas Cowboys of the NFL. He was a backup linebacker and was mostly used on special teams. He played on Super Bowl X and blocked a punt in the game. He became the only player to have participated in the championship games of both the WFL and NFL.

On August 4, 1976, he was traded to the Tampa Bay Buccaneers in exchange for a conditional draft choice (not exercised).

Tampa Bay Buccaneers
In 1976, he was waived by the Tampa Bay Buccaneers before the start of the season on September 5.

New Orleans Saints
On October 26, 1976, he signed with the New Orleans Saints as a free agent. He returned a fumble for a touchdown during the season. He was released on September 6, 1977.

Personal life
On December 1, 2005, he started coaching High School Football at Christian Life Academy. In his third season, Capone was named coach of the year, after guiding Christian Life Academy to a state Class 1A second-place finish and a 12-2 record, just two years after the Crusaders finished 0-9. On July 26, 2010, he was let go by the school, finishing with a 19-25 record (12 of his 19 wins came in 2008) in 4 seasons. This would be his only coaching job in his career. He is now retired and currently resides in Baton Rouge with his wife and two children (Olivia and Ross).

References

1951 births
Living people
Players of American football from Baton Rouge, Louisiana
American football middle linebackers
LSU Tigers football players
Birmingham Americans players
Birmingham Vulcans players
Dallas Cowboys players
New Orleans Saints players
High school football coaches in Louisiana
Catholic High School (Baton Rouge, Louisiana) alumni